Birds of Paradise is a 2021 American dance drama film written and directed by Sarah Adina Smith, based upon the 2019 novel Bright Burning Stars by A.K. Small. It stars Kristine Frøseth, Diana Silvers, Caroline Goodall, Eva Lomby, and Jacqueline Bisset. It was released on September 24, 2021, by Amazon Studios.

Plot
Kate Sanders is a newly arrived student at a prestigious ballet academy in Paris.  The students at the school are all competing for "the prize"; a contract with a ballet company which will be awarded to the best male and female dancers. On her first day, she makes a comment about Ollie, a renowned former student who committed suicide by jumping off a bridge.  This causes Ollie's sister, Marine Durand, to attack her.  The altercation leaves Marine disheveled, resulting in criticism from the academy's exacting headmistress, Madame Brunelle.  That night, Kate finds that she has been assigned to live in the same room as Marine.  Marine suggests that the two go to The Jungle, a botanical themed dance club where they do drugs.  Marine challenges Kate to a dance contest where the first one to stop dancing will be forced to drop out. After an extended time of dancing, Kate suggests to an exhausted Marine that they both stop at the same time so that neither has to drop out.  When Kate abides by her promise to stop dancing, she earns Marine's respect and friendship.

Marine and Kate grow closer over the ensuing weeks. As they prepare for the dance which will determine the winner of the prize, they, along with most of the other female students, hope to be paired with Felipe, who is widely regarded as the best male dancer at the academy. Marine and Kate begin to confide more in each other. Kate reveals that she is from a working class background and is attending the academy on a scholarship. Marine, who has lived in Paris for years, is the daughter of the US Ambassador to France. Marine must attend a party at the embassy, where it is revealed that Kate's scholarship is funded by Marine's family. Her mother, seeing Kate as potential competition, threatens to revoke the scholarship, but Marine defends Kate. Marine performs an impromptu dance sequence which ends with her knocking over a tray of drinks and injuring her feet on the broken glass. She is comforted by Jamal, a drummer from the band working the party. The two of them begin a sexual relationship.  Meanwhile, fellow dancer Jean Paul offers to supply Kate with drugs, an offer which she rebuffs.  Kate encounters financial difficulty paying for new shoes and is helped out by fellow dancer Gigi.  Becoming more stressed out by practice, she turns to Jean Paul for drugs and has sex with Felipe.   Marine and Kate have dinner with Marine's mother, who verbally undermines Marine's dance skills.  Kate defends her.  At the academy, the two of them make a pact that they will work together to jointly win the prize.  They have a threesome with Felipe.  Marine breaks up with Jamal, having become emotionally involved with Kate.

Marine reveals to Kate that she blames herself for Ollie's death.  The two of them had been dancing passionately at their home and their mother mistakenly believed they were having sex.  Afterwards, Ollie began using drugs.  On the night he killed himself, Marine ignored his phone calls. Kate comforts Marine, insisting that it wasn't her fault.  As the day of the prize draws nearer, Kate rises in the class rankings, while Marine often struggles.  The students learn of another opportunity: dancer and choreographer Benjamin Mouton is going to offer one of them the job as understudy to his principal ballerina.  Kate quickly becomes frontrunner for the position.  Kate learns that her scholarship has been cancelled and that her father has to sell their house to pay for her tuition.  Benjamin tells her how a donor once forced him to pick a ballerina by threatening to cut off funds.  An enraged Kate accuses Marine of having her parents withdraw the scholarship.  The next day, Marine learns that Kate has told the other students that Marine and Ollie were having sex.  Marine is comforted by Madame Brunelle, who recounts her own difficulties as a ballerina.  She leaves Marine with a motto: "Blessed is she who falls.  Blessed is she who rises again."  Marine, who has been paired with Felipe, offers to dance solo at the final contest and Felipe is reassigned to Kate.  At the contest, Marine dances an avant garde routine of her own design, before storming out.  Fellow dancer Luc, compliments her as a great choreographer and says he will be honored to dance for her one day.  Kate wins the prize.

Three years later, Kate is a wildly successful ballerina, headlining her own show.  After a show she is approached by Marine.  Marine says that she still dances, mainly at The Jungle.  She thanks Kate, saying that her one time friend's actions forced her to move out of her comfort zone and that she is truly happy for the first time in her life.  Kate drives away, but returns and yells at Marine that she should hate Kate for how she betrayed her.  Marine responds with Madame Brunelle's motto: "Blessed is she who falls.  Blessed is she who rises again."  At The Jungle, Kate dances a routine choreographed by Marine and rises into the air.

Cast

Production
In February 2020, it was announced that Sarah Adina Smith would write and direct Birds of Paradise, a drama film based upon the novel Bright Burning Stars by A.K. Small. Kristine Froseth, Diana Silvers, and Jacqueline Bisset would star, and Amazon Studios would distribute. Principal photography began that same month, in Budapest.

Release
It was released on September 24, 2021.

Reception
The review aggregator website Rotten Tomatoes surveyed  and, categorizing the reviews as positive or negative, assessed 18 as positive and 12 as negative for a 60% rating. Among the reviews, it determined an average rating of 6.30 out of 10.

References

External links
 
 

2021 films
2021 drama films
2020s dance films
2020s English-language films
Amazon Studios films
American dance films
American drama films
Anonymous Content films
Films about ballet
Films based on American novels
Films based on young adult literature
Films set in Paris
Films shot in Budapest
Amazon Prime Video original films
2020s American films